Agonoscelis is a genus of stink bugs that are native to the Afrotropics and Australia, but one species is established in the New World. Some species are minor or considerable pests.

They have five nymphal stages, and are 8 to 12 mm long as adults. They attack (or control) weeds and herbs including horehound, thyme, flax and cotton, or the developing seeds of sunflowers or cereals like millet or sorghum. They may swarm on a variety of other shrubs and trees, including coffee and cacao. The scent gland is located at the end of the abdomen.

Species
There are some 19 to 22 species, which include:
 Agonoscelis erosa (Westwood, 1837)
 A. e. atropurpurea Schumacher, 1913
 Agonoscelis femoralis Walker, 1868
 Agonoscelis nubila F.  – Flower head bug
 Agonoscelis puberula Stål, 1853 – African cluster bug (established in New World)
 Agonoscelis pubescens (Thunb.) – Andat bug, Sudan dura bug, Pentatomid sorghum bug, African cluster bug, syn. A. versicolor (Fabricius, 1794)
 Agonoscelis rutila (Fabricius, 1775)  – Horehound bug
 Agonoscelis versicoloratus (Turton) – Sunflower seed bug

References

Pentatomidae
Pentatomomorpha genera